This is a list of the historic counties of Wales as recorded by the 1831 census, ordered by their area.

References
1831 census

 
1831 United Kingdom census
Historic
1831 in Wales